The Lone Chance was a 1924 silent American drama film directed by Howard M. Mitchell and starring Evelyn Brent. The film is now considered lost.

Cast
 John Gilbert as Jack Saunders
 Evelyn Brent as Margaret West
 John Miljan as Lew Brody
 Edwin Booth Tilton as Governor 
 Harry Todd as Burke
 Frank Beal as Warden

References

External links

1924 films
1924 drama films
1924 lost films
Fox Film films
Silent American drama films
American silent feature films
American black-and-white films
Films directed by Howard M. Mitchell
Lost American films
Lost drama films
1920s American films